Prince George of Wales (George Alexander Louis; born 22 July 2013) is a member of the British royal family. He is the eldest child of William, Prince of Wales, and Catherine, Princess of Wales. George is the eldest grandchild of King Charles III and second in the line of succession to the British throne behind his father, making it likely that he will be the next heir apparent.

Born at St Mary's Hospital in London during the reign of his great-grandmother Queen Elizabeth II, his birth was widely celebrated across the Commonwealth realms due to the expectation that he will one day become king.

Birth 

Prince George was born on 22 July 2013 in the Lindo Wing of St Mary's Hospital, London, at 16:24 BST, during the reign of his great-grandmother Elizabeth II, as the first child of the then Duke and Duchess of Cambridge, William and Catherine. His birth was announced by press release, and was followed by the display of a traditional easel in the forecourt of Buckingham Palace. The new-born was widely hailed as a future king in the majority of British newspapers. Twenty-one-gun salutes signalled the birth in the capitals of Bermuda and New Zealand; the bells of Westminster Abbey and many other churches were rung; and landmarks in the Commonwealth realms were illuminated in various colours, mostly blue to signify the birth of a boy. On 24 July, his name was announced as George Alexander Louis. Prince George's official title and style at birth was "His Royal Highness Prince George of Cambridge", in accordance with Letters Patent dated 1898, 1917, and most recently 31 December 2012.

The great-grandchild of then reigning monarch Queen Elizabeth II, George was third in the line of succession to the British throne at the time of his birth. Speculation ensued during the pregnancy of the Duchess of Cambridge that George's birth would boost the British national economy and provide a focus for national pride. Commemorative coins were issued by the Royal Mint and the Royal Canadian Mint, the first time a royal birth had been marked that way. Prince George's birth marked the second time that three generations in direct line of succession to the throne had been alive at the same time, a situation that last occurred between 1894 and 1901, in the last seven years of the reign of Queen Victoria.

Upbringing 
George was christened by Justin Welby, Archbishop of Canterbury, in the Chapel Royal at St James's Palace on 23 October 2013, with Oliver Baker, Emilia Jardine-Paterson, Earl Grosvenor, Jamie Lowther-Pinkerton, Julia Samuel, William van Cutsem and Zara Tindall serving as godparents. The Lily Font used at the ceremony was made for Queen Victoria's first child and the water was taken from the River Jordan. 

Prince George spent his first months at his parents' cottage on the grounds of Bodorgan Hall in Anglesey, Wales, before his family relocated to Kensington Palace in 2014. His younger siblings, Charlotte and Louis, were born in 2015 and 2018, respectively. The family briefly lived in Anmer Hall in Norfolk from 2015 to 2017, before returning to primarily living in Kensington Palace. In 2022, the family moved to Adelaide Cottage in Windsor Home Park. On 8 September 2022, George's great-grandmother Elizabeth II died and was succeeded as monarch by his grandfather Charles III. George thus became second in line to the throne, after his father.

Education 
George's formal education began in January 2016, when, at the age of two, he began attending the Westacre Montessori School Nursery, near his family home at Anmer Hall in Norfolk. He attended his first day of primary school on 7 September 2017 at the Thomas's School in Battersea. He attended the school under the name of George Cambridge. George and his siblings began attending Lambrook, an independent preparatory school in Berkshire in September 2022.

Official appearances 
George embarked on his first royal tour with his parents in April 2014, during which the Cambridges spent three weeks in New Zealand and Australia. Although he only appeared twice, the BBC described the "nine-month-old future king" as "the star of the show". Prime Minister of Australia Tony Abbott predicted in Parliament House, Canberra, that George would one day be welcomed there as King of Australia. Australian media called him "the republican slayer", after polls showed the lowest support for a republicanism in the country for 35 years. In June 2015, he made his first public appearance on the balcony of Buckingham Palace following the Trooping the Colour parade marking Queen Elizabeth II's Official Birthday.

On 22 April 2016, George met U.S. President Barack Obama and his wife Michelle Obama. He was photographed with a rocking horse that the Obamas had given him when he was born. The encounter later prompted Barack Obama to joke that "Prince George showed up to our meeting in his bathrobe... a clear breach of protocol." George and his younger sister, Princess Charlotte, accompanied their parents on a tour of Canada in September 2016, and on a diplomatic visit to Poland and Germany in July 2017. In December 2019, George and Charlotte both attended their first Sandringham Christmas Day Service at St Mary Magdalene.

In March 2020, Prince George joined his siblings, Charlotte and Louis, in an online video to applaud key workers during the coronavirus pandemic. During the lockdown, George held a cake sale to raise money for Tusk Trust, a charity of which his father is a patron. In September 2020, the children met David Attenborough; Kensington Palace subsequently released a video of them asking Attenborough questions regarding environmental conservation. On 11 December 2020, they made their first red carpet appearance accompanying their parents to the London Palladium for a performance of a pantomime held to thank key workers for their efforts during the pandemic. 

On 20 June 2021, George and Charlotte accompanied their father to start a Father's Day half-marathon race for the Run Sandringham event on the Sandringham Estate.
On 29 June 2021, George accompanied his parents to a Euro 2020 Championship football match at Wembley Stadium, in which England played against Germany. A few weeks later, on 11 July, George and his parents also attended the Euro 2020 Final, where George received media attention for his enthusiasm during the game.

On 26 February 2022, George and his parents attended the Guinness Six Nations Rugby match between Wales and England at Twickenham Stadium, he met with representatives of the sport and attended a press conference where he discussed his own Rugby lessons but did not say which side he was supporting (his father is patron of the Welsh Rugby Union and his mother its English counterpart). On 29 March 2022, George accompanied his parents and sister to a service of thanksgiving for the life of the late Prince Philip, Duke of Edinburgh.

On 2 June 2022, during his great-grandmother's Platinum Jubilee celebration weekend, George and his siblings made their debut in the Trooping the Colour carriage procession. The procession was followed by a flypast, during which all three Cambridge children joined their parents, the Queen, and other working royals on the Buckingham Palace balcony. 

Shortly afterwards, on 4 June, George and Charlotte made their first official visit to Wales with their parents, where they attended concert rehearsals in Cardiff Castle, part of the Platinum Jubilee celebrations. Later that same day, George and Charlotte accompanied their parents to the Platinum Party at the Palace. The next day, on 5 June, George attended the Platinum Jubilee Pageant with his parents and siblings. Following the pageant, he joined his parents, younger siblings, the Queen, the Prince of Wales, and the Duchess of Cornwall on the Buckingham Palace balcony.

On 19 September 2022, George and his sister, accompanied by their parents, attended the state funeral of his paternal great-grandmother, Queen Elizabeth II.

Public image 

The "Prince George effect", sometimes known as the "royal baby effect", is a term used to describe an increase in the sales of clothing and other products used by George. In 2016, the dressing gown that he wore while meeting President Obama sold out after he was seen wearing it. In September 2017 the news that the Prince's school had served a Le Puy green lentil dish resulted in a spike in the sales of the legume. He was ranked number 49 on GQs "50 Best Dressed Men in Britain" list in 2015. In 2018, George became the youngest person to appear on Tatlers best-dressed list.

George's parents have been adamant about maintaining their son's privacy as he grows up. In August 2015, Kensington Palace stated that they wanted all global media to stop taking unauthorised photographs of George, saying that "a line [had] been crossed" in paparazzi methods of locating and photographing him, including surveilling the family and sending children to bring George into view.

In July 2018 an ISIS supporter and propagandist from Lancashire, who had encouraged an attack on George's school in October 2017, was jailed for life with a minimum of 25 years.

In the British satirical sketch programme Newzoids, then-toddler Prince George was depicted as a rebellious, foul-mouthed character with a lewd sense of humour. The 2016 children's book Winnie-the-Pooh Meets the Queen, written in honour of the 90th birthdays of both Queen Elizabeth II and the fictional character of Winnie-the-Pooh, features a cameo appearance from Prince George, to whom Piglet presents a red balloon. The 2021 animated sitcom The Prince stars a fictionalised eight-year-old Prince George (voiced by showrunner Gary Janetti) who makes life difficult both for his family and for the British monarchy; it was cancelled in February 2022 after the first series drew criticism for satirising children.

Title and styles
George is a British prince with the official style "His Royal Highness Prince George of Wales". During the reign of his great-grandmother, he was styled "His Royal Highness Prince George of Cambridge".

See also
Family tree of the British royal family
List of living British princes and princesses

Notes

References

External links

 Prince George at the official website of the British royal family
 

2013 births
Living people
21st-century British people
Children of William, Prince of Wales
English children
English people of Danish descent
English people of German descent
English people of Greek descent
English people of Russian descent
English people of Scottish descent
Family of Charles III
House of Windsor
Middleton family (British)
Mountbatten-Windsor family
People from London
Princes of the United Kingdom
Royal children
British princes